Pioneer Natural Resources Company is an American company engaged in hydrocarbon exploration headquartered in Irving, Texas. It operates in the Cline Shale, which is part of the Spraberry Trend of the Permian Basin, where the company is the largest acreage holder.

The company is ranked 248th on the Fortune 500.

As of December 31, 2021, the company had  of proved reserves, of which 44% was petroleum, 30% was natural gas liquids, and 16% was natural gas.

History
Pioneer Natural Resources was created in 1997 by the merger of Parker & Parsley Petroleum Company and MESA Inc., owned by T. Boone Pickens.

In 2002, Pioneer made discoveries in its offshore Oooguruk field, west of Prudhoe Bay, Alaska. In 2008, Pioneer became the first independent operator to produce oil on the Alaska North Slope. These holdings were sold for $550 million in 2013.

In 2004, Pioneer Natural Resources acquired Evergreen Resources in a $2.1 billion transaction.

In June 2010, the company announced a $1.15 billion midstream joint venture with Reliance Industries for assets in the Eagle Ford Group. The business was sold to Enterprise Products Partners for $2.15 billion in 2015.

In April 2012, the company acquired Carmeuse Industrial Sands, a silica sand manufacturer, for $297 million.

In May 2013, the company sold a 40% interest in approximately 207,000 net acres (84,000 net hectares) leased in horizontal Wolfcamp Shale to Sinochem Petroleum USA LLC, a subsidiary of Sinochem Group, for $1.7 billion.

In October 2013, the company sold its interests in Alaska to Caelus Energy Alaska for $550 million.

In 2014, the company sold non-producing assets in the Hugoton Basin to Linn Energy for $340 million.

In May 2016, CEO and chairman Scott D. Sheffield retired and was succeeded by Timothy Dove.

In June 2016, the company acquired 28,000 acres in the Midland Basin for $435 million.

In March 2017, the company sold 2,000 acres in Martin County, Texas for $266 million.

In February 2019, CEO Timothy Dove retired.

In January 2021, the company acquired Parsley Energy.

In April 2021, the company acquired DoublePoint Energy for approximately $6.4B.

References

External links

1997 establishments in Texas
Companies based in Irving, Texas
Companies listed on the New York Stock Exchange
Energy companies established in 1997
Non-renewable resource companies established in 1997
Oil companies of the United States